Hans Stelges (6 June 1901 – 17 December 1986) was a German long-distance runner. He competed in the marathon at the 1928 Summer Olympics.

References

1901 births
1986 deaths
Athletes (track and field) at the 1928 Summer Olympics
German male long-distance runners
German male marathon runners
Olympic athletes of Germany
Sportspeople from Essen
20th-century German people